The 2011 National Hockey League All-Star Game (also known as the 2011 National Hockey League All-Star Game presented by Discover) was played on January 30, 2011. The game took place at the RBC Center in Raleigh, home of the Carolina Hurricanes. Originally, the Game was supposed to be hosted by the Phoenix Coyotes, but due to ownership issues, the NHL decided to move the game. After bidding for the game reopened, it was awarded to Carolina and fulfilled a nine-year-old promise made to the franchise by NHL Commissioner Gary Bettman.

The 2011 version of the All-Star Game featured a break from the traditional way in which teams were organized. Instead of using conferences or player nationalities as in the past, teams were selected by captains in a fantasy draft days prior to the game. Fans still elected players to the All-Star Game, but instead of the traditional 12 starters (six for each team), they elected only six players, with the remaining 36 players involved in the game selected by the NHL. Sidney Crosby received the most votes of any player, but due to a concussion he was unable to participate in the game. The participating players voted for team captains, selecting Nicklas Lidstrom of the Detroit Red Wings and Eric Staal of the Hurricanes.

Staal won the first pick in the draft and selected longtime teammate Cam Ward, while the Toronto Maple Leafs' Phil Kessel was the last player chosen. The annual SuperSkills Competition was held the night before the Game and featured Alexander Ovechkin winning his third consecutive Breakaway Challenge. In addition, Zdeno Chara broke his own SuperSkills Competition record for hardest shot at 105.9 mph (170.4 km/hr). Team Staal won the contest 33–22.

Team Lidstrom won the game 11–10, the 21 combined goals was the fourth highest total scored in an NHL All-Star Game. The first Penalty shot in All-Star Game history was called after Ovechkin threw his stick to break-up a Matt Duchene breakaway. Registering one goal and two assists, Patrick Sharp of the losing Team Staal won the Most Valuable Player Award. Jeff Skinner was the youngest player to ever play in an NHL All-Star Game. Shea Weber recorded four assists, making him only the second defenceman to accomplish the feat in one All-Star Game. Fellow defenceman Lidstrom registered a +7 rating, the highest in an All-Star Game since 1991. Winning goaltender Tim Thomas became the first goaltender in NHL history to win three consecutive All-Star Games. This had been the first NHL All-Star Game since the 2009 season, since there wasn't one in 2010 due to the 2010 Winter Olympics in Vancouver, British Columbia, Canada the first time in an NHL Market.

Background
The 58th National Hockey League All-Star Game was originally scheduled to be hosted by the Phoenix Coyotes at Jobing.com Arena in Glendale, Arizona. However, due to the ongoing bankruptcy case, potential ownership changes in the Coyotes organization, and the possibility of relocation, the NHL decided to reopen bidding to host the game. In the bidding process, 14 teams made bids for All-Star Games or NHL Drafts for the next three years. Out of all the bids, the NHL chose the Carolina Hurricanes to be the new host team and on April 7, 2010, the announcement was made by NHL Commissioner Gary Bettman and Hurricanes President and General Manager Jim Rutherford.

The awarding of the All-Star Game fulfilled a nine-year-old promise Bettman made to the city of Raleigh. In 2001, he promised the organization that they would host an All-Star Game if the season ticket base reached 12,000. After reaching that plateau, Bettman indicated that other community assets were still required to secure a bid. Most notably, a proper convention center for ancillary events was needed, along with a four-star hotel, which was completed in 2009 with the new Raleigh Convention Center and adjoining Raleigh Marriott City Center in downtown Raleigh.

Three months after receiving the All-Star Game, the Hurricanes unveiled the logo for the 2011 game. The logo was designed with some homage to the host team and city hidden within it. The shape of the logo is similar to the Hurricanes primary logo, along with the team colors of red, black and silver. The banners at the top and bottom of the logo are inspired by the state flag of North Carolina.

The NHL and the city of Raleigh also presented a three-day festival to coincide with All-Star weekend called NHL All-Star Wide Open. The festivities include a series of free concerts, headlined by the band 3 Doors Down, interactive games and attractions, special appearances, Hockey Hall of Fame trophy and memorabilia displays, pin trading and trading card zones and a street party similar to the city's own annual festival, Raleigh Wide Open. There was also a charity 5K fun run, starting and ending at RBC Center with the Carolina Hurricanes "Kids 'N Community Foundation" being the beneficiary of the raised funds.

New format
On November 10, 2010, the National Hockey League Players' Association (NHLPA) unveiled a new format for selecting the NHL All-Star teams: the traditional conference format was replaced by a "fantasy draft." Fans voted for six players, from either conference (three forwards, two defencemen and one goaltender), and the NHL selected another 36 players, for a total of 42 players. The chosen players then appointed two captains; the NHL and NHLPA, with input from the players, named two alternate captains for each team. Each team had two forwards and one defenceman as its captain and alternates. The captains and alternates selected their team members in a fantasy-style draft held on January 28, 2011. The first pick was determined by a coin toss, with alternating picks after the first. Teams consisted of three goaltenders, six defencemen and 12 forwards. Although the draft rules did not dictate a strict order in which positions had to be filled, to guarantee the final picks were not constrained by having to satisfy roster composition rules, the teams' three goaltenders had to be chosen by the end of round ten, and all defencemen had to be chosen by the end of round 15. According to NHL Vice President of Hockey and Business Development Brendan Shanahan, the new format was introduced to add excitement and intrigue into all the events, while make it more fun for everyone involved.

For 2011, the NHL eliminated the YoungStars Game which had been played in the previous five All-Star weekends. However, rookies were still featured at the Super Skills Competition. A group of 12 Calder Trophy-eligible players were split into two groups of six. At the conclusion of the fantasy draft's 15th round, one rookie was selected from the 12 to choose which team his group would join for the competition.

This was the first time the traditional "East vs. West" format was not used since 2002, when the World All-Star Team defeated North America 8–5 in Los Angeles.

Uniforms
The All-Star uniforms that debuted in this game featured a unique striping pattern coming from the back of the shoulders going down the arms. As the main stripe crossed below the elbow, it, and the radiating stripes coming from it, switched from the back of the sleeves to the front. The front of the jersey also featured the player's number between the collar and the large NHL crest, an unusual placement for a uniform number. Team Staal wore white uniforms with red trim, while Team Lidstrom wore navy blue uniforms with lighter blue trim. These uniforms would return for the next All-Star Game.

The Guardian Project

During the All-Star weekend, the NHL announced a new "superhero franchise", The Guardian Project. Created by comic book writer Stan Lee, the project featured 30 new superheroes representing the 30 NHL teams, all which were unveiled at the All-Star Game. The goal of the project was to appeal to pre-teen and teenage boys in hopes of bringing in "new audience to the NHL, while engaging the existing, established hockey fan base through a compelling tale of good vs. evil."

Voting

One hundred players were chosen to be on the ballot for the All-Star Game (minimum of two players from each team), but fans were also given the option to write in any player who was not listed. Ballots were all digital for the fourth consecutive time, giving fans the ability to cast votes online at NHL.com and Facebook. Votes could also be cast via text messages from mobile devices and Smartphone users could vote by way of a mobile ballot feature. The NHL put no limitation on the number of votes an individual could cast. When fan balloting ended, 14.3 million votes had been cast and the top six were named to the All-Star Game. The six top vote recipients were from only two teams, the Pittsburgh Penguins (4) and Chicago Blackhawks (2). Individually, Sidney Crosby led all players with 635,509 votes, while teammate Kris Letang was elected as a write-in candidate. The six players elected by the fans are listed below with their vote totals.

Draft

After naming the remaining All-Stars, each player voted for team captains. The players selected the 12-time All-Star, Nicklas Lidstrom, and the captain of the host Carolina Hurricanes, Eric Staal. Lidstrom was assigned the home blue uniforms while Staal received the away whites. The NHL further named their alternate captains, placing Ryan Kesler and Mike Green with Staal while Patrick Kane and Martin St. Louis joined Team Lidstrom. Prior to the draft, the NHL determined head coaches for the teams via a coin toss. Chicago's Joel Quenneville and his assistant, Mike Haviland, were named coaches as a result of winning the Stanley Cup last year. Philadelphia Flyers Head Coach Peter Laviolette and the Vancouver Canucks' Alain Vigneault earned the distinction by having the highest winning percentage through January 8, 2011. After the coin toss, Quenneville was assigned to Team Staal, while Laviolette and Vigneault were given Team Lidstrom.

Team Staal won the first pick in the draft, and Eric Staal chose longtime teammate Cam Ward with his first pick. With the fifth pick in the draft, Team Staal selected Daniel Sedin. His twin brother Henrik was taken with the next pick by Team Lidstrom. The All-Star Game marked the first time the two have ever played against each other in an organized game. Throughout the draft, Eric Staal selected players that had a personal connection with him. He selected his brother, Rangers defenceman Marc Staal, in the seventh round, fellow Thunder Bay native Patrick Sharp in the eighth round, and teammate Jeff Skinner in the 11th round. The last player selected was Toronto's Phil Kessel. As a reward for being the last selection, he was given a new car and $20,000 was given to the charity of his choice. Kessel stated he would put the money toward a cancer charity he became involved with in 2006 when he was battling testicular cancer. When the time came for the rookies to decide which team they would participate in the skills competition, Taylor Hall, who won the right via a puck flip, chose Team Lidstrom for his group. All players were allowed to wear the numbers they use in their respective teams. For Team Lidstrom, Henrik Sedin and Dustin Byfuglien both wore number 33, while Brad Richards and Steven Stamkos wore number 91. Team Staal had three pairs having same number: Patrick Sharp and Corey Perry with number 10, Daniel Sedin and Dan Boyle with number 22 and Paul Stastny and Patrik Elias with number 26. The complete team rosters are listed below with players appearing in the order in which they were chosen.

Withdrawn
Prior to the draft several players withdrew due to injury or, in the case of Jarome Iginla, family concerns.

SuperSkills Competition

The SuperSkills competition began with the Fastest Skater competition, where the competitors skated one lap around the rink. The winner of each round earned a point for their team. The opening round was skated backwards, followed by each team's rookie representative. Then two goaltenders skated off before returning to the traditional form. Following preliminary rounds the two fastest competitors from each team faced off in a final round, where Michael Grabner defeated Taylor Hall earning two points for Team Staal. The Breakaway Challenge featured six players (three from each team) taking four shoot-out attempts. Fans voted for the winner via text message. The winner earned four points for his team. Second place was awarded three points and third received one point. Alexander Ovechkin won by a wide margin defeating second place P. K. Subban by over 17 percentage points, it was the third consecutive win in the competition by Ovechkin. Loui Eriksson finished third to round out the point earners from the competition. The Shooting Accuracy featured two players shooting targets in the four corners of the net. Winners were determined by the fastest player to hit all four targets. Daniel Sedin hit all four targets on four shots in his first round setting the overall fastest time hitting them all in just 7.3 seconds. He followed that up by hitting four in five shots during the final round to defeat the Blackhawks' Patrick Kane.

Following Shooting Accuracy, both teams participated in the Skills Challenge Relay. Each team broke into two groups and went through a series of drills designed to showcase players' skills. It started with one timers, then proceeded to passing, where a single player had to complete a pass into six small nets. From there it went to the Puck Control Relay, having a participant skate through a series of cones with a puck. Another player then took on the Stick Handling drill, controlling a puck through a series of stationary pucks. The relay ended when a final player completed the Shooting Accuracy, again hitting all four targets. The two groups from Team Lidstrom finished first and third in the competition, gaining their team a total of five points. During the Hardest Shot competition reigning champion Zdeno Chara was defeated in his preliminary round match up by Shea Weber. In the final round, Chara again matched up with Weber. Chara successfully defended his title by defeating Weber with a shot registering 105.9 mph. The speed set a new SuperSkills record surpassing his own record and marking the fourth time he has won the event. Despite being down by a large margin prior to the Elimination Shootout, Team Lidstrom still had an opportunity to win the contest. Players continued to shoot provided they scored – scoring one point per goal, until only one player remained. However, the shoot-out was won by Team Staal's Corey Perry as he was the only player to score in all three of his attempts. The full results are listed below.

Game play

The scoring started early in the game as Team Staal's Alexander Ovechkin scored the game's first goal in just 50 seconds into the first period. When he took his first shift Jeff Skinner officially became the youngest player to play in an All-Star game (18 years, 259 days) surpassing the mark set in 1984 by Steve Yzerman by eight days. By the time Claude Giroux scored, less than five minutes later, Team Staal had opened up a 4–0 lead. Team Lidstrom's Marc-Andre Fleury allowed the four goals on only nine shots while his counterpart Cam Ward stopped the first four shots he faced. The tide turned a little over halfway through the first period when Anze Kopitar scored on a backhand shot. Team Lidstrom completed the first period comeback with under four minutes left in the period when Eriksson and Matt Duchene scored 23 seconds apart to tie the game at four. Team Lidstrom finished the period scoring on four of their final ten shots.

Team Staal recaptured the lead early in the second with goals by Patrick Sharp and Kris Letang. They were unable to hold the lead though as Team Lidstrom tied the game at six with a second goal from Kopitar and one by Steven Stamkos. They quickly took their first lead on a goal by Daniel Briere just 1:20 later, ending the period up 7–6.

Early in the third period Eric Staal tied the game at seven with his first goal of the game. Minutes later Duchene got a breakaway, but before he could take a shot, Ovechkin threw his stick at the puck, resulting in the first penalty shot in All-Star game history, and only the third penalty assessed during the past ten years of All-Star competition. Duchene took the shot against Henrik Lundqvist, who stopped the attempt. Kris Letang scored shortly after the penalty shot to give back the lead to Team Staal. Briere scored a little over a minute later assisted by Weber and Henrik Sedin to re-tie the game. Weber's assist was his fourth of the game making him the second defenceman in history to record four assists in an All-Star Game (Ray Bourque, 1985). Team Lidstrom added two more goals before Rick Nash scored to cut the deficit to one. With about a minute and a half left in the game, Team Staal pulled their goaltender for the extra attacker. The decision backfired as Eriksson scored on the empty net with 1:11 remaining. Eric Staal scored with 33.6 seconds remaining to bring his team back within one goal, but they failed to get another shot on goal before time ran out. By coming back from a four-goal deficit to win the game Team Lidstrom set the record for biggest comeback victory in All-Star history. Lidstrom finished the game with a +7 rating, the highest rating since 1991 when Adam Oates was also a +7 for the Wales Conference. Tim Thomas earned the victory becoming the first goaltender to win three straight All-Star Games. Patrick Sharp was named Most Valuable Player (MVP) after registering one goal and two assists in a losing cause for Team Staal. The combined 21 goals was the fourth highest total in NHL All-Star Game history.

Summary

W – Tim Thomas
L – Henrik Lundqvist

Key
 Player1 (Player2, Player3) 1:00 denotes that Player1 scored a goal after 1:00, with assists from Player2 and Player3.
 GWG denotes the game-winning goal.
 EN denotes an empty net goal
 W denotes the goaltender awarded the win.
 L denotes the goaltender assigned the loss.

Source: NHL

Notes
A: Briere was named as a replacement for Iginla.
B: Yandle was named as a replacement for Enstrom.
C: Havlat was named as a replacement for Hemsky.
D: Stastny was named as a replacement for Crosby.
E: Skinner was named as a replacement for Malkin.
F: McBain replaced Eberle on the rookie team.
G: Subban was named as a replacement for Skinner who was promoted from the rookie team to the All-Star Game.
H: Chara's shot was 105.9 mph (170.4 km/hr), a new record.

References

External links
 Official Site

All
National Hockey League All-Star Games
NHL All-Star Game